The R10 was a line of Rodalies de Catalunya's Barcelona commuter rail service, operated by Renfe Operadora. It linked half-hourly Barcelona–El Prat Airport with Barcelona's Estació de França, using the Aragó Tunnel through central Barcelona, calling at Sants and Passeig de Gràcia stations. R10 services spanned  of railway lines and six stations. At the time it suspended services, the trains used on the line were Civia electrical multiple units (EMU).

The direct services between the airport and central Barcelona, previously provided by Barcelona commuter rail service line , had been discontinued on 4 December 2005 due to the construction works of the Madrid–Barcelona high-speed rail line in Barcelona's southern accesses. At that moment, the R1 started operating as a shuttle line between the airport and El Prat de Llobregat railway station. On 22 July 2006, the R10 started services as a newly created line of the Rodalies Barcelona commuter rail system, predecessor of Rodalies de Catalunya, providing a direct rail link between the airport and central Barcelona anew. The construction works of the new Sagrera railway station and the urban renewal project associated with it caused the suspension of the R10 on 31 January 2009. Barcelona commuter rail service line  then took over the service previously offered by the line, incorporating the branch lines to the airport and Estació de França. The R10 was initially scheduled to resume services two years later.

In the long-term future, it is projected that the R10 will be definitely suspended, and the branch line to Estació de França will be dismantled. Barcelona commuter rail service lines  and  will be rerouted in order to serve as the direct rail link between the airport and central Barcelona, using the airport as their southern terminus.

List of stations
The stations served by the R10, in order from south to north, were as follows:

 Airport
 
 
 
 Barcelona Passeig de Gràcia
 Barcelona Estació de França

References

10
Railway services introduced in 2006
Railway services discontinued in 2009